Thierry Frémaux (born 29 May 1960) is the director of the Institut Lumière, of the Lumière Film Festival and of the Cannes Film Festival.

Education and career
Frémaux has a diplôme d'études approfondies (equivalent to a Master of Advanced Studies) in film history from Lumière University Lyon 2.

In 2017, Thierry Frémaux gathered a collection of the early films by Auguste and Louis Lumière into a whole feature film Lumière ! l'aventure commence. He also voiced the French version of the film.

Bibliography
 (2017, Grasset) (English translation: Official Selection)

See also
 Letter in Motion to Gilles Jacob and Thierry Frémaux

References

External links

Biographie de Thierry Frémaux in LeFigaro.fr (in French)

1960 births
Living people
French film critics
Cannes Film Festival